Pycnococcus is a genus of green algae in the family Pycnococcaceae.

References

External links

Chlorophyta genera
Pyramimonadophyceae